Hume Parish, New South Wales is a remote rural locality of Central Darling Shire and civil parish of Tandora County in far  West New South Wales. The Parish is located at 32°18′43″S 142°22′37″E on Lake Menindee, on the out-skirts of Menindee township.

References

Localities in New South Wales